Aker Cemetery is a historic cemetery located near Smithville, Clay County, Missouri.  The Aker Cemetery is the only remaining evidence of the initial settlers in the area.  It was established about 1835, and contains 10 marked gravesites dated from 1835 to 1882, and a total of 25 graves.

It was listed on the National Register of Historic Places in 1974.

References

External links
 

Cemeteries on the National Register of Historic Places in Missouri
1835 establishments in Missouri
Buildings and structures in Clay County, Missouri
National Register of Historic Places in Kansas City, Missouri